John F. Knight, Jr. (born June 7, 1945) is an American politician who served as a member of the Alabama House of Representatives from 1993 to 2018. He is a member of the Democratic party.

Knight was also member of the House Health Committee, the Internal Affairs Committee, and the Ways and Means Committee. He has been an advocate for the funding of minority higher education in Alabama, and is the named plaintiff of Knight v. Alabama.

References

Living people
Democratic Party members of the Alabama House of Representatives
1945 births
21st-century American politicians